D&E may refer to:

 Davis & Elkins College, a small liberal arts college in West Virginia
 Delaware and Eastern Railroad, which later became the Delaware and Northern Railroad
 De Queen and Eastern Railroad
 Dilation and evacuation, a surgical procedure
 The Design and Evolution of C++, a book about the history of the C++ programming language